Gaietà Cornet may refer to:
Gaietà Cornet i Palau,  the artistic director of the Cu-Cut! magazine
Gaietà Cornet Pàmies, born August 22, 1963, a retired 400 metres runner from Spain